Lindsay Davenport won in the final 6–2, 6–3 against Meghann Shaughnessy.

Seeds
A champion seed is indicated in bold text while text in italics indicates the round in which that seed was eliminated. The top five seeds received a bye to the second round.

  Lindsay Davenport (champion)
  Monica Seles (semifinals)
  Jennifer Capriati (semifinals)
  Mary Pierce (withdrew)
  Kim Clijsters (quarterfinals)
  Justine Henin (first round)
  Lisa Raymond (quarterfinals)
  Meghann Shaughnessy (final)
  Elena Likhovtseva (second round)

Draw

Final

Top half

Bottom half

References
 2001 State Farm Women's Tennis Classic draw

2001 Singles
2001 WTA Tour